The Western University College of Veterinary Medicine (WesternU CVM) is a non-profit, private, veterinary medical school at Western University of Health Sciences located in Pomona, in the US state of California. The college consists of about 400 veterinary medical students, and confers the degree Doctor of Veterinary Medicine. The college was established in 1998 as the first veterinary school to open in the country in 20 years. The college is fully accredited by the American Veterinary Medical Association.

History
The College of Veterinary Medicine opened in 1998, after some difficulties with accreditation through the American Veterinary Medical Association's Council on Education. It was the first veterinary medical school to open in the United States since 1983, and at the time, no member on the AVMA's Council on Education had ever been involved in accrediting a new veterinary medical school. The inaugural class began courses in 2003, and the college earned full accreditation in 2010.

WesternU CVM was the first veterinary medical school in the United States to appoint a female to the position of dean.

In 2008, the Banfield Pet Hospital on campus was opened to the community, providing primary care services such as vaccinations, spaying and neutering, microchiping, surgery, dental exams and cleanings, as well as flea, tick and heartworm control. The hospital includes a surgical suite, an x-ray room, a half dozen exam rooms and isolation facilities. The hospital is housed in a 6,000 square-foot facility on campus, and provides first and second year students with early exposure to clinical care.

Academics
The College of Veterinary Medicine has an entirely problem-based curriculum, rather than lecture-based.  This style of curriculum, with its emphasis on small group work and research, is purported to improve skills that may be less-developed in a lecture format and provide students with more flexibility in determining their study schedule and style. Critics of problem based learning argue that a more structured curriculum is more effective, especially in the beginning portions of program while students are developing active learning skills. Public health is also emphasized throughout the veterinary medicine curriculum.

Veterinary students at WesternU complete clinical rotations at any of more than 300 teaching sites, which contrasts with the traditional model of veterinary education in the US, where students rotate primarily at a large, single, teaching hospital.

Along with students from the other colleges at Western University, students at WesternU CVM participate in interprofessional education. The program is intended to improve understanding of other health professions and to provide and promote a team approach to patient-centered care and health care management, leading to improved patient care. Some evidence supports the effectiveness of interprofessional education in encouraging collaborative practice, although it is not firmly established.

The College of Veterinary Medicine has nearly 400 students; in the fall of 2011, the college received nearly 740 applications for 105 positions.

See also
 Veterinary medicine in the United States
 Western University College of Osteopathic Medicine - California campus
 Western University College of Osteopathic Medicine - Oregon campus
 Western University College of Podiatric Medicine

References

Further reading

External links 
Western University of Health Sciences
Banfield Pet Hospital at Western University of Health Sciences

Education in Pomona, California
Educational institutions established in 1998
Schools accredited by the Western Association of Schools and Colleges
Universities and colleges in Los Angeles County, California
Veterinary schools in the United States
1998 establishments in California
Universities using Problem-based learning
Western University of Health Sciences